The Irish League in season 1895–96 comprised 4 teams, and Distillery won the championship after a play-off with Cliftonville.

League standings

Results

References
Northern Ireland - List of final tables (RSSSF)

1895-96
1895–96 domestic association football leagues
Lea